Omalluq Oshutsiaq (1948–2014) was an Inuit sculptor.

Her work is included in the collections of the Musée national des beaux-arts du Québec, Musée national des beaux-arts du Québec,  the McCord Museum and the Art Gallery of Hamilton.

References

1948 births
2014 deaths
20th-century Canadian sculptors
Canadian male sculptors
20th-century Canadian male artists
20th-century Canadian women artists
21st-century Canadian sculptors
21st-century Canadian women artists
Inuit artists
Canadian women sculptors
People from Kinngait
21st-century Canadian male artists